Mykytivskyi District is an urban district of the city of Horlivka, Ukraine.

Urban districts of Horlivka